The Unity Broadcasting Network is an over-the-air religious television network. The company is headquartered in Booneville, Mississippi, and individual transmitter stations are located in Mississippi and Tennessee.

Programming
The Unity Broadcasting Network airs many local programs from various churches and Christians in the area. During times when locally produced programs are not aired the station airs programs from the Smile of a Child TV network and the Legacy TV network. Unity also carries Local weather provided by Mississippi Weather Media LLC. www.mswxmedia.com

List of Stations

Current Stations
W32EV-D 32 Adamsville, Tennessee
W34DV-D 34 Booneville, Mississippi
W39CA-D 39 Fulton, Mississippi

Possible Future Stations
Channel 42 in Rolla, Missouri.
 30 in Lexington, Tennessee (Construction Permit)
 45 Humboldt, Tennessee (Construction Permit)

Former Stations
 6 Selmer, Tennessee
W15CG 15 Pontotoc, Mississippi
 45 Russellville, Alabama
 46 Tuscumbia, Alabama
K38HE-D 38 West Plains, Missouri

Cable coverage
UBN's website lists that their translator on Channel 34 is carried on Comcast Cable 8 in Corinth, Mississippi, and their MySpace account says they are on channel 56.

References

External links
 Official Unity Broadcast Network web-site
 
 
 
 

Television networks in the United States
Religious television stations in the United States
Television channels and stations established in 2005